ESWS may refer to:

ESWS (band), an American rock band from Honolulu, Hawaii
Enlisted Surface Warfare Specialist, a military badge of the United States Navy
The Essential Service Water System in a nuclear power plant